Favorites is the third compilation album by American country music artist Crystal Gayle. The album consists of some of Gayle's lesser-known songs from the period she was signed to United Artists Records. It was released in April 1980, only a short time after a greatest hits compilation album, Classic Crystal.

The album peaked at #37 on the Billboard Country Albums chart, and at #149 on the main Billboard 200 chart.

Track listing

Chart performance

1980 compilation albums
Crystal Gayle albums
Albums produced by Allen Reynolds